Claudio Matías Mirabaje Correa (born March 6, 1989, in Montevideo) is a Uruguayan footballer currently playing as an attacking midfielder for Racing Club de Montevideo in Uruguayan Primera División .

International career
Mirabaje has played for the Uruguay under-20 team at the 2009 FIFA U-20 World Cup in Egypt.

Statistics

Titles
Nacional
Uruguayan Primera División: 2010-11

References

External links
 
 
 Profile at Tenfield Digital 
 

1989 births
Living people
Uruguayan footballers
Uruguay under-20 international footballers
Uruguayan expatriate footballers
Association football midfielders
Racing Club de Montevideo players
Club Nacional de Football players
Montevideo Wanderers F.C. players
Once Caldas footballers
San Lorenzo de Almagro footballers
Argentinos Juniors footballers
Club Athletico Paranaense players
Club Atlético Patronato footballers
Juventud de Las Piedras players
Mumbai City FC players
Uruguayan Primera División players
Categoría Primera A players
Uruguayan expatriate sportspeople in India
Argentine Primera División players
Expatriate footballers in Colombia
Expatriate footballers in Argentina
Expatriate footballers in Brazil
Expatriate footballers in India